The Years of Rice and Salt is an alternate history novel   by American science fiction author Kim Stanley Robinson, published in 2002. The novel explores how world history might have been different if the Black Death plague had killed 99 percent of Europe's population, instead of a third as it did in reality. Divided into ten parts, the story spans hundreds of years, from the army of the Muslim conqueror Timur to the 21st century, with Europe being re-populated by Muslim pioneers, the indigenous peoples of the Americas forming a league to resist Chinese and Muslim invaders, and a 67-year-long world war being fought primarily between Muslim states and the Chinese and their allies. While the ten parts take place in different times and places, they are connected by a group of characters that are reincarnated into each time but are identified to the reader by the first letter of their name being consistent in each life.

The novel explores themes of history, religion, and social movements. The historical narrative is guided more by social history than political or military history. Critics found the book to be rich in detail, realistic, and thoughtful. The Years of Rice and Salt won the Locus Award for Best Science Fiction Novel in 2003. In the same year it was nominated for the Arthur C. Clarke Award, a Hugo Award, and a British Science Fiction Award.

Background
At the time of publication in 2002, science fiction author Kim Stanley Robinson was 49 years old and living in Davis, California. He had conceived of the premise for The Years of Rice and Salt in the 1970s while thinking about what alternate history scenario would result in "the biggest change that would still work in terms of comparison to our history". He subsequently developed an interest in China and in Buddhism, which he would study for this project.

Robinson's only other alternate history story prior to this project was the short story "The Lucky Strike" (1984), where the Enola Gay crashes in a training exercise and the secondary crew must complete the Hiroshima bombing.

Robinson also wrote an essay titled "A Sensitive Dependence on Initial Conditions" (1991), comparing different theories of history and laws of science, such as the covering law model, to explain how alternate histories can be arrived at, using "The Lucky Strike" as an example.

He explored the idea of non-Western influences creating a new culture while working on his Mars trilogy, which involved a heavy Muslim influence in a Martian colony. The Mars trilogy gave Robinson a reputation for quality of writing and a richness of detail comparable to James Michener, as well as winning him a Nebula Award for Red Mars (1993) and two Hugo and Locus Awards for Green Mars (1994) and Blue Mars (1996). Robinson followed the Mars trilogy with the novel Antarctica (1997), which won an Alex Award, and two short story collections, The Martians (1999) and Vinland the Dream (2001), before publishing The Years of Rice and Salt.

Plot
The story is divided into ten parts.

Book One
Book One, Awake to Emptiness, begins with Bold and Psin, scouts in Timur's army, discovering a Magyar city where all the inhabitants have died from a plague. Timur turns his army around and orders the scouting party executed to avoid the plague, but Bold escapes and wanders through the dead lands of Eastern Europe, encountering only one lone native. Upon reaching the sea he is captured by Turkish Muslim slave-traders and sold into Zheng He's Chinese treasure fleet. Bold befriends a young African slave, named Kyu, whom he cares for after the Chinese castrate him. In China, they are kept as kitchen slaves until escaping and eventually making their way north to Beijing where they find work at the palace of Zhu Gaozhi, heir to the Yongle Emperor. The vengeful Kyu hates the Chinese for what they have done to him and he incites violence between the eunuchs and the Confucian administrative officials.

Book Two
Book Two, The Haj in the Heart, begins in Mughal India where a Hindu girl named Kokila poisons her husband's father and brother after discovering their plot to defraud the village. She is executed for her crime, but is reborn as a tiger that befriends a man named Bistami, a Sufi mystic of Persian origin. Bistami goes on to become a judge for Mughal Emperor Akbar, but later falls into his disfavour, being exiled to Mecca. Bistami spends one year in Mecca before travelling overland to the Maghreb and Iberia (Al-Andalus). Bistami then joins a caravan led by Sultan Mawji and his wife, Katima, who seek to leave Al-Andalus and found a new city on the other side of the Pyrenees, beyond the control of the Caliph of Al-Andalus. They build the city of Baraka on the abandoned former site of Bayonne, France, and create a model society in which Sultana Katima is highly influential. Katima seeks to change the Islamic religion to create equality between men and women, by rejecting the Hadiths and relying only on her interpretation of the Quran. She rules the community after her husband dies (something not allowed in normal Islamic practice), but the Caliph of Al-Andalus eventually hears of their "heresy" and sends an army against them. The community flees further to the north, where they build a new city named Nsara (near Nantes, France) and are able to defend it from further aggression in later years.

Book Three
In Book Three, Ocean Continents, the Wanli Emperor launches an invasion against Nippon (Japan) but the huge fleet is swept out to sea by the Kuroshio Current and they are set adrift on the unexplored Pacific Ocean. The fleet hopes to be brought back to China eventually by the great circular currents of the Pacific, but they accidentally discover the New World. The sailors make landfall on the West coast of North America and make contact with the indigenous population (the peaceful Miwok people), but quickly leave once Admiral Kheim discovers they have inadvertently infected the indigenous people with devastating diseases. They take a small girl with them (whom they have taught Chinese and named "Butterfly") and sail south where they meet another civilization rich in gold. There they narrowly escape being ritually sacrificed by using their flintlock firearms, something the natives have never seen before. They eventually return to China and tell the Emperor that he could easily conquer this new land and gain its great wealth.

Book Four
Book Four, The Alchemist, takes place in Samarkand, in the 17th century. An alchemist named Khalid attempts to fool the Khan into believing that he has discovered the Philosopher's stone, but his fraud is uncovered and his hand is chopped off as punishment. Khalid becomes depressed and disenchanted with alchemy and decides to destroy all his Alchemical books. His friend Iwang (a Tibetan Buddhist mathematician) and son-in-law Bahram (a Sufi blacksmith) instead convince him to test the veracity of the claims in the books and thus see if there is any true wisdom to be gained. They devote themselves to practical demonstrations and experiments that greatly improve knowledge of various aspects of physics, chemistry, mathematics, biology, and weaponry, and in the process create the scientific method. Their discoveries create interest (and alarm) amongst the religious madrasahs of the city, many of whom also go along with the new fashion of building and testing scientific apparatuses. But most of all, they catch the eye of the Khan's powerful advisor, who sees in their inventions the possibility of great military technology, to fight the rising Chinese threat to the East.

Book Five
Book Five, Warp and Weft, describes how a former samurai, fleeing from Japan (which was conquered by China along with most of the rest of East Asia) to the New World, travels all the way across the continent to meet the Iroquois people. They name him "Fromwest" and make him a chief of their confederacy. He helps organize their society into a larger defensive alliance of all the North American tribes (the Hodenosaunee League) and shows them how to make their own guns with which to resist the Chinese coming from the West and the Muslims coming from the East.

Book Six
Book Six, Widow Kang, follows the life of Chinese widow Kang Tongbi during the reign of the Qianlong Emperor. She takes in a poor Buddhist monk, Bao Ssu, and his son whom she finds scavenging, but the monk is wrongly implicated in a series of queue cuttings and is killed by Qing magistrates. Later, Kang meets a Hui Muslim scholar named Ibrahim ibn Hasam and together they discover it is possible to remember their past lives. They marry and move to Lanzhou in western China, where they undertake work to try to reconcile Islamic and Confucian beliefs. Kang creates and collects works of proto-feminist poetry and becomes a known writer. There is a Muslim rebellion in the region due to the Qing intolerance of new Islamic sects coming from the west, but the revolt is crushed with massive force.

Book Seven
Book Seven, The Age of Great Progress, is set during the 19th century and begins during a war between the Ottoman Empire and the Indian state of Travancore. The Indians have previously defeated the Mughals and the Safavids and have developed more modern forms of warfare, emphasising surprise and mobility, they have also invented steam engines and ironclad warships that they sail straight to the city of Konstantiniyye and capture it with the aid of military balloons. The Ottomans are defeated easily. A Muslim Armenian doctor named Ismail ibn Mani al-Dir, who had served the Ottoman Sultan, is captured and sent to Travancore where he learns of the amazing advancements that have been made on the sub-continent such as railways and factories. He happily joins the hospital of Travancore and begins work in anatomy and physiology. Ismail eventually meets their ruler, the Kerala of Travancore, who pursues scientific and philosophical advancement (a kind of Enlightened Despot). The Kerala's aim is to drive the Muslim invaders away and peacefully unify India into a kind of democratic confederation. Later, during the Xianfeng Emperor's reign, in the Chinese colony known as Gold Mountain, major flooding in the Central Valley of California forces the evacuation of Chinese colonial towns and Japanese settlers alike. The Japanese had originally fled to the new world to escape Chinese oppression in their homeland, but find themselves once again under the Chinese yoke. A displaced Japanese slave, Kiyoaki, and a pregnant Chinese refugee, Peng-ti, manage to flee to the great coastal city of Fangzhang. There Kiyoaki joins a secret Japanese freedom movement that is being aided by Travancore, with Ismail acting as a go-between agent.

Book Eight
Book Eight, War of the Asuras, is set in the 20th century, during the "Long War". The world has become divided into three large alliances, the Chinese Empire and its colonies, the fractured Muslim world (Dar al-Islam), and the democratic Indian and Hodenosaunee Leagues. At the outbreak of war the Muslim states put aside their differences and unite to fight the larger threat of China (whom they fear will soon achieve global hegemony). The Indian and Hodenosaunee Leagues stay neutral at first, but eventually ally with China, as they see the Muslims as their greater enemy, however the Muslims invade northern India all the way down to Burma to stop the Indians and Chinese from linking up. The war drags on for decades causing major changes in the societies involved, with rapid industrialisation, mass conscription and mass casualties (both sides are forced to use women in the fighting to make up for manpower losses). Being the first industrial war, new devastating weapons and methods are employed, such as trench warfare, poison gas and aerial bombing. The story follows Chinese officers, Kuo, Bai and Iwa as they desperately fight in the trenches of the Gansu Corridor, where the ground has been blasted down to bedrock by sixty years of bombardments. The new Chinese government, the "Fourth Assemblage of Military Talent", orders a new offensive against the Muslim lines in Gansu. Kuo, Bai and Iwa are told to use poison gas and then frontally assault the enemy trenches. They do this successfully, but are beaten back by the second line of Muslim defences, losing tens of thousands of soldiers and gaining nothing. They are then told that their attack was merely a diversion for the real offensive, which is being conducted by the Japanese (who have recently been freed by China in exchange for alliance in the war) through Siberia. The Muslims are in retreat but the Japanese get bogged down at the Ural Mountains. In the meantime, Kuo is killed by a shell that penetrates their bunker. Bai and Iwa are ordered to move with their company south through Tibet to support their Indian allies. At a pass in the Himalayas they witness the Muslim artillery blasting the top of Mount Everest down so that the tallest mountain in the world will be in Muslim lands. After extreme difficulties they manage to breach the Muslim defences at the pass and the Chinese army pours through to meet up with the Indians, turning the course of the war in their favour. Bai is plagued by visions of his dead friend Kuo, who tells him that none of this is happening and that he is already dead, killed by the shell earlier. Bai does not know whether he is indeed living real life or is already in the afterlife.

Book Nine
Book Nine, Nsara, follows the life of a young Muslim woman named Budur and her aunt Idelba in Europe, in the aftermath of the Long War. Budur's family is highly traditional and as there are not enough men left after the war for marriage prospects, she is forced to live in seclusion with her female cousins in the family's compound in Turi, a city in one of the Alpine Emirates. Idelba is an educated woman and was involved in physics research in Firanja before her husband's death, she is just as unhappy in Turi as Budur and wishes to return to her former work. One night, Idelba escapes and Budur follows her. Together they leave the life of captivity in the Alps and move to the more liberal and cosmopolitan city of Nsara (Saint-Nazaire in France). There they stay at a zawiyya, a refuge for women, Idelba restarts her work in physics and Budur enrolls in university where she studies history. The history class is presided over by Kirana, a radical feminist lecturer who questions everything about Muslim society. Budur becomes close to Kirana who opens her eyes to the injustices that women face and how they can seek emancipation and liberation (the two have a brief affair). Life at the university allows for open debate about all issues and Kirana focuses on the nature of history and contemporary events, such as the Muslim defeat in the Long War, which she blames on the failure of the Islamic countries to properly mobilize women for the war effort (something that the Chinese did almost totally). There is also a newfound interest in ancient history as the field of archaeology is taking off (theories about how and why the plague killed off the Europeans centuries before are a popular topic).

Life in Nsara (and all the Muslim nations) becomes increasingly difficult as they face the effects of defeat in the war. Since casualties were so massive, there is a great shortage of men over women and many men who survived the fighting returned as disabled veterans (Budur volunteers to help veterans blinded by gas at a hospital by reading to them). The Muslims were forced to pay reparations to the victorious countries and to make various humiliating concessions such as allowing Buddhist monasteries to open in their cities. There is a general depression and malaise in post-war Muslim society, made worse by the economic difficulties; hyperinflation, food shortages and strikes. In many counties this leads to governments being overthrown in coups of various kinds. In Nsara itself, order begins to break down as people are near starvation and the military attempts to overthrow the government and impose a police state. However many liberals, including Budur and Kirana start mass street protests against this reactionary dictatorship. Eventually the Hodenosaunee League (who have become very powerful after their victory in the war) intervene by sending a fleet (from their naval base at Orkney) to Nsara, insisting that the military relinquish power, which they do. After this, things slowly start to improve, but most of the Muslim states continue to suffer grave problems. Even in China, a victorious country, there is unrest that turns into civil war.

Throughout this, Idelba has been secretly working on atomic physics and she and her fellow researchers have made some disturbing discoveries. They conclude that it would be possible to make a devastating weapon from nuclear chain reactions and fear that the military will try to create such bombs and restart the war. In order to prevent this, Idelba tries desperately to hide all evidence about her research and contacts concerned scientists in other parts of the world. The government learns of her work however and raids the Zawiyya to get hold of her papers, but Budur manages to hide them. Idelba eventually dies of radiation poisoning from the materials she was working with and leaves all her research to Budur, who keeps her secret and eventually manages to organize an international conference of scientists to discuss the nuclear issue. The meeting is held in Isfahan in Iran (one of the few Islamic nations that has prospered since the war) and scientists from all over the world attend. They agree that none of them will work on the creation of nuclear weapons for their respective countries, no matter what pressure they are put under by their governments and also start a new international scientific movement to break down barriers between cultures in a spirit of reconciliation and friendship (they even create a new scientific calendar to be used by the whole world, with its year zero set from the time of the conference).

Book Ten
Book Ten, The First Years, follows Bao Xinhua. Bao is a revolutionary in China, who works under the leadership of his friend, Kung Jianguo. Bao and Kung successfully overthrow the oppressive Chinese government, but Kung is killed on the cusp of their victory. Deeply depressed and disillusioned, Bao leaves China and begins a voyage around the world. Bao marries and raises two children before accepting a diplomatic post in Myanmar. Eventually, Bao's wife dies, and he begins to wander once again. Bao spends time studying with a comrade from his revolutionary years named Isao Zhu, who poses many macrohistorical questions about the world in which they live. In his later years, Bao moves to Fangzhang to teach history and the philosophy of history, and at the end of the novel, he meets a new student named Kali.

Style, themes and genre
The novel is divided into ten chapters that each act as a short story, linked by the use of a group of people who appear in each story. After spending time in bardo, the group (or jāti) are reincarnated into different times and places. While characters in each story are unique, they share some characteristics with their previous incarnations and are linked, for convenience, by the first letter of their name. The characters whose names begin with the letter K are "combative, imprudent and prone to getting himself (or herself) killed" and "striking blows against injustice that typically lead to more suffering". The B characters are "more comfortable in the world, meliorist and optimistic" and "survivors, nurturing friends and family through bad times and patiently waiting for something better". The I characters are "the ones who care, who follow the other two, and may be necessary if their works are to flourish, but who tend to the domestic and always find the world worth loving." The style of writing also changes every chapter to reflect the style of writing associated with the culture being depicted. For example, the first chapter is written similarly to Monkey's Journey to the West and a later chapter incorporates postmodernism. Also, later chapters take on metafictional elements, with characters discussing the nature of history, whether it is cyclical or linear, whether they believe in reincarnation, and feelings that some people are intrinsically linked.

Robinson incorporated utopian themes in his previous works but reviewers were divided on whether The Years of Rice and Salt qualified as a utopian story. Those that did call the world described in the story as utopian cited the story's illustration of progress. However, those that wrote The Years of Rice and Salt was not a utopian story say that the world history presented is not necessarily better or worse than the real history, just different. Robinson calls himself a "utopian novelist" in that he claims "all science fiction has a utopian element, in that it tends to say that what we do now matters and will have consequences". Several other themes were identified by reviewers. Robinson had previously used the theme of memory (or identity) and incorporates it into this story with characters who are reincarnated versions of previous characters and who only recognize each other while in the bardo, but sometimes feel a connection between themselves while on earth. The reviewer in The Globe and Mail identified feminism and "struggles over the nature of Islam" as recurring themes.

Alternate history

The Years of Rice and Salt belongs to the alternate history subgenre of speculative fiction. The novel starts at the point of divergence with Timur turning his army away from Europe where the Black Death killed 99 percent of Europe's population, instead of a third. Robinson explores world history from that point in AD 1405 (807 AH) to about AD 2045 (1467 AH) with Mughal Emperor Akbar being the last character with a real-world counterpart.

Robinson's take on alternate history is that because it "is set in the same lawful universe as ours, its science must be the same [and] because its people have the same basic human needs, their societies resemble ours." Therefore, despite the difference in who specifically is there, "the great majority of humanity [is] doing their work, and that work would tend to forge along at a certain pace as people tried to solve the problems of making themselves more comfortable in this world."

While most alternate histories use the Great Man theory of history, focusing on leaders, wars, and big events, Robinson writes more about social history, similar to the Annales School of historical theory and Marxist historiography, focusing on the lives of ordinary people living in their time and place. This is reflected in the title of the novel, The Years of Rice and Salt, which refers to the everyday chores of raising a family, often performed by women, despite the politics and wars of men.

Reviewers noted this allows for the "history [to be] experienced by readers on a human scale" and "an implicit but thorough rebuke to the kind of war-gaming determinism that most alternate histories embody." The novel has characters that explore subjects like philosophy, theology, history, and scientific theory.

Publication and reception

Released in March 2002, the book was published in North America by Bantam Books and in the United Kingdom by HarperCollins. The paperback was released in 2003 along with a Spanish translation. In the subsequent years, other translated versions were published, in French, Polish, Chinese, and Hungarian.

The novel was well received by critics who variously called it "thoughtful", "realistic", and "rich". In Publishers Weekly, the reviewers called it a "highly realistic and credible alternate history", and in the School Library Journal, Christine Menefee called it "an addictive, surprising, and suspenseful novel". The Library Journal "highly recommended" it, saying that its "superb storytelling and imaginative historic speculation make [it] a priority choice for all SF and general fiction collections". The critic at Kirkus Reviews found it "overlong, but blessed with moments of wry and gentle beauty". Likewise, Roz Kaveney stated that "if there is a weakness in Robinson's work, it is perhaps this; his characters are so intelligent that they never shut up".  For The Globe and Mail, Sol Chrom lauded the epic scope, calling it a "magnificent achievement", and for The Belfast News Letter, the reviewer called the novel "extraordinary, ambitious, poetic and powerful". Science fiction critic Paul Kincaid concluded that it is "a huge, complex and highly enjoyable book".

Awards
It won the 2003 Locus Award for Best Science Fiction Novel and was nominated for the Hugo Award, the Arthur C. Clarke Award, and the British Science Fiction Award.

See also
Other alternate-history novels where the Black Death was much deadlier in Europe, which was subsequently colonized in whole or part by Muslims:
The Gate of Worlds, by Robert Silverberg, published in 1966,
The Crystal Empire, by L. Neil Smith, published in 1986, and
In High Places, by Harry Turtledove, published in 2005.

Lion's Blood, by Steven Barnes published in 2003, also takes place in a world dominated by Islam.

Notes

References

Further reading

External links
The Years of Rice and Salt at KimStanleyRobinson.info
Retrospective review by Jo Walton

2002 American novels
American alternate history novels
American philosophical novels
Bisexuality-related fiction
Novels about the Black Death
Cultural depictions of Akbar
HarperCollins books
Mughal Empire in fiction
Novels by Kim Stanley Robinson
Philosophy of history
Novels about reincarnation
Religion in science fiction
Novels set in India